Josef Orth (born 1914, date of death unknown) was a Czech football defender who was a member of the Czechoslovakia national team at the 1938 FIFA World Cup. However, he never earned a cap for the national team. He also played for ŠK Slovan Bratislava.

References

External links
FIFA profile

1914 births
Year of death missing
Czechoslovak footballers
Association football defenders
1938 FIFA World Cup players
Czech footballers
ŠK Slovan Bratislava players